In the mathematical theory of stochastic processes, local time is a stochastic process associated with semimartingale processes such as Brownian motion, that characterizes the amount of time a particle has spent at a given level. Local time appears in various stochastic integration formulas, such as Tanaka's formula, if the integrand is not sufficiently smooth. It is also studied in statistical mechanics in the context of random fields.

Formal definition

It is a notion invented by Paul Lévy. The basic idea is that  is an (appropriately rescaled and time-parametrized) measure of how much time  has spent at  up to time . More rigorously, it may be written as the almost sure limit

which may be shown to always exist. For a discrete state-space process , the local time can be expressed more simply as

Tanaka's formula
Tanaka's formula also provides a definition of local time for an arbitrary continuous semimartingale  on 
 
A more general form was proven independently by Meyer and Wang; the formula extends Itô's lemma for twice differentiable functions to a more general class of functions. If  is absolutely continuous  with derivative  which is of bounded variation, then
 
where  is the left derivative.

If  is a Brownian motion, then for any  the field of local times  has a modification which is a.s.

Tanaka's formula provides the explicit Doob–Meyer decomposition for the one-dimensional reflecting Brownian motion, .

Ray–Knight theorems
The field of local times  associated to a stochastic process on a space  is a well studied topic in the area of random fields. Ray–Knight type theorems relate the field Lt to an associated Gaussian process.

In general Ray–Knight type theorems of the first kind consider the field Lt at a hitting time of the underlying process, whilst theorems of the second kind are in terms of a stopping time at which the field of local times first exceeds a given value.

First Ray–Knight theorem
Let (Bt)t ≥ 0 be a one-dimensional Brownian motion started from B0 = a > 0, and (Wt)t≥0 be a standard two-dimensional Brownian motion W0 = 0 ∈ R2. Define the stopping time at which B first hits the origin, . Ray and Knight (independently) showed that

where (Lt)t ≥ 0 is the field of local times of (Bt)t ≥ 0, and equality is in distribution on C[0, a]. The process |Wx|2 is known as the squared Bessel process.

Second Ray–Knight theorem
Let (Bt)t ≥ 0 be a standard one-dimensional Brownian motion B0 = 0 ∈ R, and let (Lt)t ≥ 0 be the associated field of local times. Let Ta be the first time at which the local time at zero exceeds a > 0
 
Let (Wt)t ≥ 0 be an independent one-dimensional Brownian motion started from W0 = 0, then

Generalized Ray–Knight theorems

See also
 Tanaka's formula
 Brownian motion
 Random field

Notes

References
K. L. Chung and R. J. Williams, Introduction to Stochastic Integration, 2nd edition, 1990, Birkhäuser, .
M. Marcus and J. Rosen, Markov Processes, Gaussian Processes, and Local Times, 1st edition, 2006, Cambridge University Press 
P. Mörters and Y. Peres, Brownian Motion, 1st edition, 2010, Cambridge University Press, .

Stochastic processes
Statistical mechanics